Shane Jolley (born 1971/72) is a Canadian politician, small-business owner, and cycling advocate. From 2008 to 2011, Jolley served as the male deputy leader for the Green Party of Ontario.

Early life

Jolley was born in Meaford, Ontario to Ralph Jolley and Joanne Goff.

After living in Ottawa for four years following high school, Jolley returned home. In 1995, Jolley began working with his father in the family's store, Jolley’s Cycle Centre, outside Meaford. In 2000, following a restructuring of the business, Jolley established Jolley’s Alternative Wheels and, in 2001, moved the business to 2nd Ave. E. in Owen Sound.

Federal politics

Jolley stood as the Green Party of Canada's candidate in the riding of Bruce-Grey-Owen Sound in the 2006 Federal Election. Placing third with 12.91% of the vote, Jolley was the highest polling Green candidate in Canada.

Provincial politics

In the 2007 provincial election, Jolley was the Green Party's candidate in Bruce—Grey—Owen Sound and came in second place with more than 33 per cent of the vote, giving Jolley the best finish of any Green Party candidate in a Canadian federal or provincial election at that time.

Following the election, Jolley defeated three other candidates to be elected Green Party of Ontario male deputy leader at the party's annual convention in 2008, serving alongside Judy Smith Torrie as the party's female deputy leader.

Jolley declined to run for the Green Party nomination for the 2011 election, withdrawing suddenly from the nomination race against Municipality of West Grey councillor Don Marshall. In October 2011, Jolley announced he would be standing as an independent candidate in the 2011 election. Jolley highlighted his fiscally-conservative, socially-liberal attitudes, praising portions of the Progressive Conservative platform, calling for local solutions to issues, and attacking rigid partisanship. Jolley finished fifth with 3.58% of the vote.

Personal life

In 2008, Jolley was sentenced to probation after he pled guilty to a trespassing charge. Jolley had been personally investigating a spate of thefts of high-priced bicycles in Owen Sound and mistakenly found himself on the property of two local residents. Jolley attempted to personally apologize for the incident, but the homeowners opted to pursue legal action.

Jolley lives in Owen Sound with his wife and three daughters.

Electoral record

References

Living people
Green Party of Ontario candidates in Ontario provincial elections
Green Party of Canada candidates in the 2006 Canadian federal election
People from Owen Sound
Independent candidates in Ontario provincial elections
1971 births